is a Japanese football player. He plays for Vegalta Sendai.

Career
Yosuke Akiyama joined J2 League club Nagoya Grampus in 2017.

Club statistics
Updated to 9 December 2022.

References

External links
Profile at Nagoya Grampus

1995 births
Living people
Waseda University alumni
Association football people from Chiba Prefecture
Japanese footballers
J1 League players
J2 League players
Nagoya Grampus players
Júbilo Iwata players
Vegalta Sendai players
JEF United Chiba players
Association football midfielders